Sandpaper tree is a common name for several plants and may refer to:

Curatella americana, native to northern South America, Central America, and the Caribbean
Ehretia anacua, native to Texas and northeastern Mexico
Ficus exasperata, native to Africa and Asia

See also
Sandpaper fig